Lost in Pacific Time: The AP/EP is an EP by The Academy Is... It was released on September 22, 2009 to the iTunes Store, and was also sold on the AP Fall Ball Tour. A limited amount was also available from the band's website. The first track, "I'm Yours Tonight", was made available for play on The Academy Is...'s MySpace page. Another track, "Days Like Masquerades" was played at an anti-suicide benefit at Barrington High School, in Chicago, Illinois. It was the final release by the band before their disbandment in 2011 and eventual reformation in 2022. It is also their final release to feature lead guitarist Michael Guy Chislett.

Leading up to the release of the EP, William Beckett posted and linked lyrics from the EP on his blog. All the tracks are listed as "EP versions". "Sputter" also features Jack's Mannequin singer Andrew McMahon.

Track listing
"I'm Yours Tonight" – 3:39
"Days Like Masquerades" – 3:32
"Sputter" (featuring Andrew McMahon of Jack's Mannequin) – 4:21
"New York (Saint in the City)" – 3:34
"In the Rearview" – 3:41

Personnel
William Beckett – vocals
Michael Guy Chislett – lead guitar
Mike Carden – rhythm guitar
Adam T. Siska – bass
Andy "The Butcher" Mrotek – drums
Andrew McMahon - piano / backing vocals ("Sputter")

References

External links

Lost in Pacific Time: The AP/EP at YouTube (streamed copy where licensed)

The Academy Is... albums
2009 EPs
Fueled by Ramen EPs
Alternative rock EPs